Georgios Trichias (born 14 September 1979) is a Greek former professional footballer.

References

1979 births
Living people
Greek footballers
Niki Volos F.C. players
Panelefsiniakos F.C. players
Athinaikos F.C. players
AEK Athens F.C. players
Panetolikos F.C. players
Apollon Smyrnis F.C. players
Kalamata F.C. players
Messiniakos F.C. players
Olympiacos Volos F.C. players
Thrasyvoulos F.C. players
Makedonikos F.C. players
Rodos F.C. players
Panachaiki F.C. players
AO Chania F.C. players
Super League Greece players
Association football forwards
Footballers from Volos